Elections to South Cambridgeshire District Council took place on Thursday 5 May 2016 as part of the 2016 United Kingdom local elections. Nineteen seats, making up one third of South Cambridgeshire District Council, were up for election. Seats up for election in 2016 were last contested at the 2012 election.

Summary
The list of candidates was published on 8 April 2016. The Conservative Party and the Labour Party stood candidates in all 19 wards up for election. The Liberal Democrats had 16 candidates, the Green Party had 12 candidates and the United Kingdom Independence Party had four candidates. There were four independent candidates.

This was the last election by thirds to South Cambridgeshire District Council before the council moved to all-out elections starting from 2018.

Results

Results by ward

References

2016
2016 English local elections
2010s in Cambridgeshire